"Kannski Varð Bylting Vorið 2009" is EGÓ's first song in 25 years. It was released on January 10, 2009. Bubbi first performed the song at a radio show Poppland at Rás 2 on January 5. On January 7, EGÓ recorded the song at Stúdíó Sýrland. EGÓ also recorded another song by Bubbi called "Fallega Þú" but later got the name “Í Hjarta Mér”. All of their albums have been recorded at Hljóðrita in Hafnarfjörður except that one. The single was released to promote EGÓ's upcoming album 6. Október but for some reasons the song was not included on the album.

Track listing

Personnel 

 Arnar Geir Ómarsson – drums
 Bergþór Morthens – electric guitar
 Bubbi Morthens – vocals, electric guitar & acoustic guitar
 Hrafn Thoroddsen – orgel
 Jakob Magnússon – bass

Charts

External links 
 Studio Sýrland
 The song at Tónlist.is
 
 Sena

2009 singles
Icelandic songs
2009 songs